The Bishop of Dromore is an episcopal title which takes its name after the original monastery of Dromore in County Down, Northern Ireland. In the Roman Catholic Church the title still continues as a separate bishopric, but in the Church of Ireland it has been united with other bishoprics.

History
The monastery of Dromore is believed to have been founded by St Colman, first bishop or abbot of Dromore, sometime between 497 and 513. The first building was a small wattle and daub church on the northern bank of the River Lagan. Only a couple of the names of the monastic-bishops survive. Mael-Brigid Mac Cathasaigh, bishop and abbot of Dromore, died in 972, and in the Annals of Ulster record the death of Riagán, bishop of Druim Mór, in 1101.

The diocese of Dromore was established through the reorganisation of the Irish Church in the late 12th century, possibly at the synod held in Dublin in 1192 by the papal legate, Múirges Ua hÉnna, Archbishop of Cashel. The diocese coincided with the territory of the Uí Echach Cobo, which later became the baronies of Upper and Lower Iveagh, and the lordship of Newry, County Down.

Following the Reformation, there were parallel apostolic successions. In the Church of Ireland, the bishopric continued until it became part of the united bishopric of Down, Connor and Dromore in 1842. In 1945, Connor was separated leaving the current bishopric of Down and Dromore.

In the Roman Catholic Church, the bishopric of Dromore continues as a separate title. The most recent Incumbent was the Most Reverend John McAreavey, Bishop of the Roman Catholic Diocese of Dromore, who was appointed by the Holy See on 4 June 1999 and was ordained bishop on 19 September 1999. He resigned on 1 March 2018, effective 26 March 2018.

List of bishops

Pre-Reformation bishops

Post-Reformation Church of Ireland bishops

Post-Reformation Roman Catholic bishops

Notes

References

Dr
Dro
Religion in County Down
Roman Catholic Diocese of Dromore